Michael Oenning (born 27 September 1965) is a German football coach and former player. He formerly managed Vasas Budapest, Hamburger SV, 1. FC Nürnberg, 1. FC Magdeburg, and Aris.

Playing career
Oenning graduated in German and Sports science. During 80's and 90's he had a playing career, during which he played for Eintracht Coesfeld, SV Wilmsberg, SC Preußen Münster, Hammer SpVg, TSG Dülmen and SC Pfullendorf.

Managerial career

Early career
In 1999, he started coaching career. Oenning worked as coach employed by Württemberg Football Association, from 1999 until 2004. In 2000, he joined the coaching staff of the German U-18 and U-20 selections, where he was an assistant.

In 2004, he was named an assistant manager to Dick Advocaat in Borussia Mönchengladbach. Oenning worked there until 2005, when he joined Holger Fach and later Klaus Augenthaler in Wolfsburg, also as an assistant. After two seasons, in 2007, Oenning joined VfL Bochum, as their youth coach. During one season, he was working with U-19 selection. Few months after he took a position of Bochum's youth coach, he was sacked.

Nürnberg and Hamburg
He wasn't unemployed for long, because he joined Thomas von Heesen in February 2008, as his assistant in 1. FC Nürnberg.

Von Heesen and Oenning were working together until 28 August 2008, when Von Heesen got sacked and Oenning replaced him. This was his first experience as head coach. After a slow start in 2. Bundesliga, Oenning was able to guide Nürnberg to a third-place finish and a playoff with 16th place Energie Cottbus. Nürnberg won the playoff 5–0 on aggregate and plays in the Bundesliga since 2009. On 21 December 2009, Oenning was sacked.

Hamburger SV named him an assistant to Armin Veh prior to the 2010–11 Bundesliga season. But after Veh got fired, Oenning became the new head coach. He signed a two-year contract, until June 2013. After a poor start in 2011–12 season that saw Hamburg in last place with only one point out of six games, Oenning was sacked.

Vasas
On 2 January 2016 Oenning was appointed as the manager of Nemzeti Bajnokság I club Vasas SC.

In the 2015–16 Nemzeti Bajnokság I season Vasas finished 10th and preserved their first league membership, therefore Oenning's contract was prolonged.

In the 2016–17 Nemzeti Bajnokság I season Vasas started with 2 consecutive victories. The team beat MTK Budapest away and Debreceni VSC at home.

Magdeburg
He was appointed as the head coach of 1. FC Magdeburg on 14 November 2018. He left Magdeburg after the season.

Újpest
On 23 December 2020 he was appointed as the manager of Nemzeti Bajnokság I club Újpest FC. Oenning won the 2020–21 Magyar Kupa season with Újpest FC by beating Fehérvár FC in the 2021 Magyar Kupa Final at the Puskás Aréna. Although Oenning produced the best results during his career, he was dismissed on 31 December 2021 due to unsatisfactory results. A couple of weeks later, he was replaced by Serbian Miloš Kruščić.

Managerial statistics

References

External links

1965 births
Living people
People from Coesfeld
Sportspeople from Münster (region)
Hamburger SV managers
German footballers
German football managers
1. FC Nürnberg managers
1. FC Magdeburg managers
Bundesliga managers
2. Bundesliga managers
Super League Greece managers
Vasas SC managers
Aris Thessaloniki F.C. managers
German expatriate football managers
German expatriate sportspeople in Hungary
German expatriate sportspeople in Greece
German expatriate sportspeople in Austria
Expatriate football managers in Hungary
Expatriate football managers in Greece
Expatriate football managers in Austria
SC Pfullendorf players
Hammer SpVg players
Association football midfielders
Footballers from North Rhine-Westphalia
SC Preußen Münster players
Újpest FC managers
Nemzeti Bajnokság I managers
FC Wacker Innsbruck (2002) managers
West German footballers